The 2002 Pittsburgh Panthers football team represented the University of Pittsburgh in the 2002 NCAA Division I-A football season.

Schedule

Roster

Coaching staff

Team players drafted into the NFL

References

Pittsburgh
Pittsburgh Panthers football seasons
Guaranteed Rate Bowl champion seasons
Pittsburgh Panthers football